Indigenous people under the nation-state have experienced exclusion and dispossession. With the rise in globalization, material advantages for indigenous populations have diminished. At times, national governments have negotiated natural resources without taking into account whether or not these resources exist on indigenous lands. In this sense for many indigenous populations, the effects of globalization mirror the effects of the conquest in the mid 16th century.

In response, indigenous political movements have emerged in various countries in North and South America. These movements share similarities. Many seek specific rights for indigenous populations. These rights include the right to self-determination and the right to preserve their culture and heritage. Aims differ. One of the main differences is the way in which they organize themselves to meet their objectives. There have been movements in Latin America to unite indigenous populations separated by national borders. The following are examples of groups that have organized in order to be heard on a transnational level. These movements call for indigenous rights to become a universal right to be acknowledged by all countries with indigenous populations.

Transnational organizations

Coordinator of Indigenous Organizations of the Amazon River Basin (COICA)
This organization coordinates the following nine national Amazonian indigenous organizations:
 Caribbean Amerindian Development Organization (CADO) 
 Indigenous Democracy Defense Organization (IDDO) 
 Interethnic Association for the Development of the Peruvian Rainforest (AIDESEP)
 Amerindian People’s Association of Guyana (APA)
 Confederation of Indigenous people of Bolivia (CIDOB)
 Coordination of the Indigenous Organizations of the Brazilian Amazon (COIAB)
 Confederation of Indigenous Nationalities of the Ecuadorian Amazon (CONFENIAE)
 Regional Organization of Indigenous Towns of the Amazon
 Federation des Organisations Amerindiennes de Guyane
 Organization Van Inheemsen in Suriname
 Organization of the Indigenous Towns of the Colombian Amazonia

Indian Council of South America (CISA)
The Indian Council of South America was founded in 1980. It is a non-governmental organization that works in consultation with the Economic and Social Council of the United Nations. This council also seeks to maintain relations with international agencies such as UNESCO, FAO, and WHO. One of CISA’s objectives is to promote respect for the right to life, justice, development, peace, and autonomy of the indigenous peoples and Nations.
CISA also coordinates an exchange of knowledge, experiences and projects between indigenous peoples and nations in respect to development that will improve their welfare.

International Mayan League
One of the most important goals for the International Mayan League is to return to the Mayan balance that was interrupted with the Spanish conquest of 1524. This group, similar to COICA, works to preserve and inform people about the culture of the Mayan people. This group has reached out to other states like Costa Rica and some of the states in the United States in order to carry out activities in the areas of teaching, research, and services. One of the defining factors about this group is that it does not have any formal leadership roles appointed to any one person. Rather, the Mayan League sticks to its ancestral beliefs that all can participate in decision making activity. Some of the problems that the Maya League seeks to combat are racism, repression, marginalization, and poverty. Currently, there is a large population of Maya living in Guatemala.

Mexico has the most adapted modern Maya peoples today; they are from Mayan Yucatec branch, most of them totally integrated into the Mexican economy, from peasants, retail, handcraft or "Maquiladora" factory workers to doctors, engineers and politicians.

Belize also has one of the largest populations of Maya peoples. The issues that they face today include the exploitation of their land, such as logging and the oil industry.

Indigenous organizations according to country

Argentina

 Indigenous Association of the Republic of Argentina (AIRA)
 National Organization of Indigenous Peoples of Argentina (ONPIA)

Barbados
Eagle Clan Lokono-Arawaks (who also created and lead the Indigenous Democracy Defense Organization)

Belize

 Belize Indigenous Training Institute
 Caribbean Organization of Indigenous Peoples (COIP)

Bolivia
 Confederation of Indigenous people of Bolivia, previously known as Indigenous Confederation of the East, Chaco, and Bolivian Amazon (CIDOB)
 Sole Syndical Confederation of Rural Workers of Bolivia (CSUTCB)
 National Council of Ayllus and Markas of Qollasuyu (CONAMAQ)
 Organization of Aymara Women of Kollasuyo

Brazil
 Coordination of the Indigenous Organizations of the Brazilian Amazon (COIAB)
 Coordinating Council of Indigenous Peoples and Organizations of Brazil (CAPOIB)
 Indianist Missionary Council (CIMI)
 Indigenous Council of Roraima
 Pro-Yanomami Commission (CCPY)
 Union of Indigenous Nations of Acre and South of the Amazon (UNI-AC)
 Articulation of Indigenous Peoples of the South Region - Arpin-South

Canada
 Assembly of First Nations
 Métis National Council
 Inuit Tapiriit Kanatami
 Pauktuutit
 Native Women's Association of Canada
 Confederation of Aboriginal People of Canada
 Centre for Indigenous Sovereignty
 Congress of Aboriginal Peoples
 First Peoples National Party of Canada
 National Centre for First Nations Governance

Chile

 Council of All the Mapuche Lands (CTLTM)
 Nehuen-Mapu Mapuche Association
 Nankuchew Indigenous Association of Nag-Che Territory
 Development and Communications Organization, Xeg-Xeg Mapuche

Colombia
 National Indigenous Organization of Colombia (ONIC)
 Movement of Indigenous Authorities of Colombia (AICO)
 Organization of Indigenous Peoples of the Colombian Amazon (OPIAC)
 Authorities of Traditional U’wa Indigenous of Boyaca
 Council of Embera Katio Alto Sinu
 Regional Indigenous Counsel of Cauca (CRIC)
 Indigenous Organization of Antioquia

Costa Rica

 National Indigenous Table of Costa Rica
 Regional Aboriginal Association of Dikes (ARADIKES)
 Bribri Cabagra Indigenous Association

Dominican Republic 

Higuayagua Taino of the Caribbean
 Guabancex-viento y Agua

Ecuador
 Confederation of Indigenous Nationalities of Ecuador (CONAIE)
 Confederation of Indigenous Nationalities of the Ecuadoran Amazon (CONFENIAE)
 Confederation of Peoples of Kichua National of Ecuador (ECUARUNARI)
 National Confederation of Campesino, Indigenous, and Black Organizations (FENOCIN)
 Ecuadorian Federation of Evangelical Indigenous (FEINE)
 Scientific Institute of Indigenous Cultures

El Salvador

 Coordinating Association of Indigenous Communities of El Salvador
 National Association of Indigenous Salvadoran (Asociación Nacional Indígena Salvadoreña)
 National Indigenous Coordinating Council of El Salvador

Guatemala

 Coordination of Organizations of the Maya People of Guatemala Saqb’ichill (COPMAGUA)
 National Coordination of Widows of Guatemala (CONAVIGUA)
 National Indigenous and Campesino Coordination (CONIC)
 Maya Defenders
 Rigoberta Menchu Tum Foundation

Guyana

 Federation of Amerindian Organizations of Guyana (FOAG)
 Amerindian Peoples’ Association of Guyana (APA)

Honduras

 Civic Council of Popular and Indigenous Organizations of Honduras (COPINH)
 Confederation of Autochthonous Peoples of Honduras (CONPAH)

Mexico
 National Pluralistic Indigenous Assembly for Autonomy
 National Indigenous Congress (CNI)
 National Coordination of Indigenous Women
 National Confederation of Coffee Grower Organizations (CNOC)
 Organization of Traditional Indigenous Doctors and Midwives of Chiapas (COMPITCH)
 Guerreran Counsel 500 Years of Indigenous Resistance
 Tepeyac Human Rights Center of the Isthmus of Tehuantepec
 Union of Indigenous Communities in the Northern Zone of the Isthmus (UCIZONI)
 Zapatista Army of National Liberation (EZLN)
 Popular Indigenous Council of Oaxaca "Ricardo Flores Magón"

Nicaragua

 Communitarian Miskito Nation
 Association of Indigenous Women on the Atlantic Coast (AMICA)
 Indigenous Movement of Jinotega (MIJ)

Panama

 National Coordination of Indigenous Peoples of Panama (COONAPIP)
 General Congress of Kuna Culture (CGCK)
 Institute for the Integral Development of Kuna Yala (IDIKY)
 Movement of Kuna Youth (of the General Kuna Congress)
 Ngobe-Bugle General Congress

Paraguay

 Coordination of Indigenous Peoples of the Cuenca of Pilcomayo River
 Native League for Autonomy, Justice, and Ethics

Peru

 Permanent Coordination of Indigenous Peoples of Peru (COPPIP)
 Interethnic Association of Development of the Peruvian Jungle (AIDESPEP)
 Native Federation of Madre de Dios River and Streams (FENAMAD)

Puerto Rico
 
 United Confederation of Taino People (UCTP)
 Taino Tribal Nation of Boriken
 Turabo Aymaco Taino Tribe of Puerto Rico

Suriname

 Organization of the Indigenous of Suriname

Venezuela

 National Indian Council Venezuela (CONIVE)
 Regional Organization of Indigenous Amazonian Peoples (ORPIA)

United States
 International Indian Treaty Council
 National Congress of American Indians
 National Indian Youth Council
 Native American Rights Fund
 Mexica Movement

Indigenous movements in Latin America by country 
Latin America is primarily known for their growing indigenous rights movement. Groups within countries have done work to publicize indigenous rights in their respective countries.

Trans-national movements 
Transnational movements have helped publicize the indigenous rights movement in Latin America. Trans-national movements regarding indigenous rights could be seen as the whole being greater than the sum of its parts. Many political related movements regarding the rights of indigenous peoples have taken hold particularly in the 1990s due to "time and allies." Political collaboration has been integral for the progress of indigenous peoples. Multilateral agencies and NGO's have been helping to increase leverage for indigenous peoples rights. The first Peruvian president of indigenous origin, Alejandro Toledo, was elected in 2001. This marked the first time that someone of Indian descent was the ruler since the 1930s. Transnational organizations have been credited for contributing to Cué's victory in Mexico. The Front of Binational Organizations (FIOB), one of the most active indigenous organizations, is credited for this feat. Trans-national movements like the FIOB "represents a broad network of relationships, organizational structures, and cultural traditions." Solidarity is one of the main attributes for the success of trans-national movements.

Global trans-national movements also influence regional movements. For example, since the UN Declaration on the Rights of Indigenous People was passed, there has been progress made for the indigenous rights movement. Trans-national movements aim to enforce these policies through their work with domestic movements throughout the Americas.

One of the newest and most controversial in terms of radical actions, is the Indigenous Democracy Defense Organization or IDDO, it has created an Indigenous all volunteer'Foreign Legion' that has taken the defense of Indigenous rights to unprecedented / albeit still technically legal -levels, in various countries of Latin America, such as training various tribes in front-line zones of criminal activity, such as narco-trafficking areas or conflict zone areas, basic marksmanship community self defense skills, for both genders and for all age groups. This is a Pan-Tribal and Global Indigenous entity created by radical Caribbean Indigenous Rights activist Damon Gerard Corrie - a Barbados born Lokono-Arawak of Guyanese descent, who was one of the Caribbean Indigenous members of the 20 person Hemispheric Indigenous Peoples Working Group at the Organization of American States/OAS from the year 2000 to 2016, that collectively negotiated the American Declaration on the Rights of Indigenous Peoples  into existence and final adoption by the OAS in 2016. It is the second most important Indigenous Rights declaration after the United Nations Declaration on the Rights of Indigenous Peoples, and is a document that asserts the rights of the Hemispheres 70 million indigenous peoples.      
The IDDO was itself an offshoot of the recently created Caribbean Amerindian Development Organization/CADO  that was the brainchild of Damon Gerard Corrie and Shirling Simon of the Lokono of Barbsados and Guyana, Roberto Borrero and Tai Pellicier of the Taino of Puerto Rico, and Irvince and Florence Auguiste of the Kalinago of Dominica. CADO is the most geographically diverse Indigenous NGO in the Caribbean with Taino membership in Cuba, Hispaniola and Puerto Rico, Kalinago membership in Dominica and Saint Vincent, Lokono membership in Barbados and Guyana, Makushi membership in Amazonia, Kuna membership in the San Blas islands in the far western Caribbean Sea, and Embera membership in Panama Central America.

Transnational movements have shifted their focus towards environmental rights. As deforestation occurs in areas such as the Amazon, many movements aim to work in solidarity to bring these secondary issues to light. Amazon Watch is one non-governmental organization that aims to publicize the plight of deforestation in the Amazon in regards to the lives of indigenous peoples. Oil drilling is one issue that Amazon Watch fights against. A pipeline spill in the Peruvian Amazon highlights the plight of indigenous protests. Five indigenous communities sought to remediate the polluted sites and gain compensation for damages to their land. This shift has helped to gain more awareness as environmental protection becomes more important in the rights for indigenous peoples. The Dakota Access Pipeline protests is one example of the fight for indigenous rights to sacred land in the United States. More than 40% of the Standing Rock Sioux Tribe live below the poverty line and this pipeline could negatively affect both the environment and well-being of the tribe. Similarly, the Escobal mine protests in Guatemala have centered around both environmental issues and the land sovereignty of the indigenous Xinca people.

Brazil

Background 
Indigenous rights have largely been ignored throughout Brazil's history. They were considered "second-class citizens" and much of their land was taken away for economic development. Brazil is also historically known for the "physical and cultural extermination of the indigenous peoples." However, the indigenous movement in Brazil has largely grown since the 1980s. Although policies have been changed to include the rights of the indigenous peoples, it ignores the collective right to their land.

Cases 
The 2002 Xucuru case in Brazil highlights the role of the state in the struggle of present-day indigenous peoples in Brazil. The Inter-American Commission on Human Rights was asked to safeguard Marcos de Araújo, after they received death threats regarding their right to indigenous land. The state rejected this request because of various reasons. Much of the Indian rights movement in Brazil focus on right to land, and not individual liberties. Although indigenous tribes are marginalized and largely unrepresented in government, Brazil's Articulation of Indigenous People's have staged protests around major cities in Brazil to focus on fighting for territorial rights of the native peoples. The result of this issue shows that "constitutional recognition of indigenous human rights and a multicultural and collectivist perspective does not eliminate the legal and political obstacles to implementing those rights."

See also

 Pan-Indianism
 List of indigenous rights organizations
 Indigenous peoples of the Americas
 Zapatista Army of National Liberation

References

External links

 weblinkCOICA.html 
 News for Everyone -
 0017.html
 Juan Houghton and Beverly Bell, "Latin American Indigenous Movements in the Context of Globalization" Americas Program (Silver City, NM: Interhemispheric Resource Center, October 11, 2004).

Movement
 
Social movements